An English country house is a large house or mansion in the English countryside. Such houses were often owned by individuals who also owned a town house. This allowed them to spend time in the country and in the city—hence, for these people, the term distinguished between town and country. However, the term also encompasses houses that were, and often still are, the full-time residence for the landed gentry who ruled rural Britain until the Reform Act 1832. Frequently, the formal business of the counties was transacted in these country houses, having functional antecedents in manor houses.

With large numbers of indoor and outdoor staff, country houses were important as places of employment for many rural communities. In turn, until the agricultural depressions of the 1870s, the estates, of which country houses were the hub, provided their owners with incomes. However, the late 19th and early 20th centuries were the swansong of the traditional English country house lifestyle. Increased taxation and the effects of World War I led to the demolition of hundreds of houses; those that remained had to adapt to survive.

While a château or a Schloss can be a fortified or unfortified building, a country house, similar to an Ansitz, is usually unfortified. If fortified, it is called a castle, but not all buildings with the name "castle" are fortified (for example Highclere Castle in Hampshire).

Stately homes of England

The term stately home is subject to debate, and avoided by historians and other academics. As a description of a country house, the term was first used in a poem by Felicia Hemans, "The Homes of England", originally published in Blackwood's Magazine in 1827. In the 20th century, the term was later popularised in a song by Noël Coward, and in modern usage it often implies a country house that is open to visitors at least some of the time.

In England, the terms "country house" and "stately home" are sometimes used vaguely and interchangeably; however, many country houses such as Ascott in Buckinghamshire were deliberately designed not to be stately, and to harmonise with the landscape, while some of the great houses such as Kedleston Hall and Holkham Hall were built as "power houses" to dominate the landscape, and were most certainly intended to be "stately" and impressive. In his book Historic Houses: Conversations in Stately Homes, the author and journalist Robert Harling documents nineteen "stately homes"; these range in size from the vast Blenheim Palace and Castle Howard to the minuscule Ebberston Hall, and in architecture from the Jacobean Renaissance of Hatfield House to the eccentricities of Sezincote. The book's collection of stately homes also includes George IV's Brighton town palace, the Royal Pavilion.

Evolution 

The country houses of England have evolved over the last five hundred years. Before this time, larger houses were usually fortified, reflecting the position of their owners as feudal lords, de facto overlords of their manors. The Tudor period of stability in the country saw the building of the first of the unfortified great houses. Henry VIII's Dissolution of the Monasteries saw many former ecclesiastical properties granted to the King's favourites, who then converted them into private country houses. Woburn Abbey, Forde Abbey and many other mansions with abbey or priory in their name became private houses during this period. Other terms used in the names of houses to describe their origin or importance include palace, castle, court, hall, mansion, park, house, manor, and place.

It was during the second half of the reign of Elizabeth I, and under her successor, James I, that the first architect-designed mansions, thought of today as epitomising the English country house, began to make their appearance. Burghley House, Longleat House, and Hatfield House are among the best-known examples of the showy prodigy house, often built with the intention of attracting the monarch to visit. By the reign of Charles I, Inigo Jones and his form of Palladianism had changed the face of English domestic architecture completely, with the use of turrets and towers as an architectural reference to the earlier castles and fortified houses completely disappearing. The Palladian style, in various forms, interrupted briefly by baroque, was to predominate until the second half of the 18th century when, influenced by ancient Greek styles, it gradually evolved into the neoclassicism championed by such architects as Robert Adam.

Some of the best known of England's country houses were built by one architect at one particular time: Montacute House, Chatsworth House, and Blenheim Palace are examples. While the latter two are ducal palaces, Montacute, although built by a Master of the Rolls to Queen Elizabeth I, was occupied for the next 400 years by his descendants, who were gentry without a London townhouse, rather than aristocracy. They finally ran out of funds in the early 20th century.

However, the vast majority of the lesser-known English country houses, often owned at different times by gentlemen and peers, are an evolution of one or more styles with facades and wings in different styles in a mixture of high architecture, often as interpreted by a local architect or surveyor, and determined by practicality as much as by the whims of architectural taste. An example of this is Brympton d'Evercy in Somerset, a house of many periods that is unified architecturally by the continuing use of the same mellow, local Ham Hill stone.

The fashionable William Kent redesigned Rousham House only to have it quickly and drastically altered to provide space for the owner's twelve children. Canons Ashby, home to poet John Dryden's family, is another example of architectural evolution: a medieval farmhouse enlarged in the Tudor era around a courtyard, given grandiose plaster ceilings in the Stuart period, and then having Georgian façades added in the 18th century. The whole is a glorious mismatch of styles and fashions that seamlessly blend together. These could be called the true English country house. Wilton House, one of England's grandest houses, is in a remarkably similar vein; although, while the Drydens, mere squires, at Canons Ashby employed a local architect, at Wilton the mighty Earls of Pembroke employed the finest architects of the day: first Holbein, 150 years later Inigo Jones, and then Wyatt followed by Chambers. Each employed a different style of architecture, seemingly unaware of the design of the wing around the next corner. These varying "improvements", often criticised at the time, today are the qualities that make English country houses unique.

Sizes and types

There are no written terms for distinguishing between vast country palaces and comparatively small country houses; the descriptive terms, which can include castle, manor and court, provide no firm clue and are often only used because of a historical connection with the site of such a building. Therefore, for ease or explanation, Britain's country houses can be categorised according to the circumstances of their creation.

Power houses 

The great houses are the largest of the country houses; in truth palaces, built by the country's most powerful – these were designed to display their owners' power or ambitions to power. Really large unfortified or barely fortified houses began to take over from the traditional castles of the crown and magnates during the Tudor period, with vast houses such as Hampton Court Palace and Burghley House, and continued until the 18th century with houses such as Castle Howard, Kedleston Hall and Holkham Hall. Such building reached its zenith from the late 17th century until the mid-18th century; these houses were often completely built or rebuilt in their entirety by one eminent architect in the most fashionable architectural style of the day and often have a suite of Baroque state apartments, typically in enfilade, reserved for the most eminent guests, the entertainment of whom was of paramount importance in establishing and maintaining the power of the owner. The common denominator of this category of English country houses is that they were designed to be lived in with a certain degree of ceremony and pomp. It was not unusual for the family to have a small suite of rooms for withdrawing in privacy away from the multitude that lived in the household. These houses were always an alternative residence to a London house.

During the 18th and 19th centuries, for the highest echelons of English society, the country house served as a place for relaxing, hunting and running the country with one's equals at the end of the week, with some houses having their own theatre where performances were staged.

The country house, however, was not just an oasis of pleasure for a fortunate few; it was the centre of its own world, providing employment to hundreds of people in the vicinity of its estate. In previous eras, when state benefits were unheard of, those working on an estate were among the most fortunate, receiving secured employment and rent-free accommodation. At the summit of this category of people was the indoor staff of the country house. Unlike many of their contemporaries prior to the 20th century, they slept in proper beds, wore well-made adequate clothes and received three proper meals a day, plus a small wage. In an era when many still died from malnutrition or lack of medicine, the long working hours were a small price to pay.

As a result of the aristocratic habit of only marrying within the aristocracy, and whenever possible to a sole heiress, many owners of country houses owned several country mansions, and would visit each according to the season: Grouse shooting in Scotland, pheasant shooting and fox hunting in England. The Earl of Rosebery, for instance, had Dalmeny House in Scotland, Mentmore Towers in Buckinghamshire, and another house near Epsom just for the racing season. For many, this way of life, which began a steady decline in 1914, continued well into the 20th century, and for a few continues to this day.

Minor country houses 
In the second category of Britain's country houses are those that belonged to the squirearchy or landed gentry. These tend either to have evolved from medieval hall houses, with rooms added as required, or were purpose-built by relatively unknown local architects. Smaller, and far greater in number than the "power houses", these were still the epicentre of their own estate, but were often the only residence of their owner.

However, whether the owner of a "power house" or a small manor, the inhabitants of the English country house have become collectively referred to as the ruling class, because this is exactly what they did in varying degrees, whether by having high political influence and power in national government, or in the day-to-day running of their own localities or "county" in such offices as lord/deputy lieutenant, magistrates, or occasionally even clergy.

The Country house mystery was a popular genre of English detective fiction in the 1920s and 1930s; set in the residence of the gentry and often involving a murder in a country house temporarily isolated by a snowstorm or similar with the suspects all at a weekend house party.

Victorian houses 

Following the Industrial Revolution of the 18th century, a third category of country houses was built as newly rich industrialists and bankers were eager to display their wealth and taste. By the 1850s, with the English economy booming, new mansions were built in one of the many revivalist architectural styles popular throughout the 19th century. The builders of these new houses were able to take advantage of the political unrest in Europe that gave rise to a large trade in architectural salvage. This new wave of country house building is exemplified by the Rothschild properties in the Home counties and Bletchley Park (rebuilt in several styles, and famous for its code-breaking role in World War II).

Decline 

The slow decline of the English country house coincided with the rise not just of taxation, but also of modern industry, along with the agricultural depression of the 1870s. By 1880, this had led some owners into financial shortfalls as they tried to balance maintenance of their estates with the income they provided. Some relied on funds from secondary sources such as banking and trade while others, like the severely impoverished Duke of Marlborough, sought to marry American heiresses to save their country houses and lifestyles.

The ultimate demise began immediately following World War I. The members of the huge staff required to maintain large houses had either left to fight and never returned, departed to work in the munitions factories, or filled the void left by the fighting men in other workplaces. Of those who returned after the war, many left the countryside for better-paid jobs in towns. The final blow for many country houses came following World War II; having been requisitioned during the war, they were returned to the owners in poor repair. Many estate owners, having lost their heirs, if not in the immediately preceding war then in World War I, were now paying far higher rates of tax, and agricultural incomes had dropped. Thus, the solution for many was to hold contents auctions and then demolish the house and sell its stone, fireplaces, and panelling. This is what happened to many of Britain's finest houses.

Despite this slow decline, so necessary was the country house for entertaining and prestige that in 1917 Viscount Lee of Fareham donated his country house Chequers to the nation for the use of a prime minister who might not possess one of his own. Chequers still fulfills that need today as do both Chevening House and Dorneywood, donated for sole use of high-ranking ministers of the Crown.

Today 
Today, many country houses have become hotels, schools, hospitals, museums and prisons, while others have survived as conserved ruins, but from the early 20th century until the early 1970s, hundreds of country houses were demolished. Houses that survived destruction are now mostly Grade I or II listed as buildings of historic interest—and only the most faithful, most accurate, and most precise restoration and re-creation are permitted. Such work, however, is usually very expensive, although the system does ensure that everything is done correctly and authentically. The negative side is that many owners cannot afford the work.

Although the ownership or management of some houses has been transferred to a private trust, most notably at Chatsworth, other houses have transferred art works and furnishings under the Acceptance in Lieu scheme to ownership by various national or local museums, but are retained for display in the building. This enables the former owners to offset tax, the payment of which would otherwise have necessitated the sale of the art works. For example, tapestries and furniture at Houghton Hall are now owned by the Victoria and Albert Museum. In addition, increasing numbers of country houses hold licences for weddings and civil ceremonies. Another source of income is to use the house as a venue for parties, a film location and a corporate entertainment venue. While many country houses are open to the public, they remain inhabited private houses, in some cases by the descendants of their original owners.

The lifestyles of those living and working in a country house in the early 20th century were recreated in a BBC television programme, The Edwardian Country House, which was filmed at Manderston House in Scotland. Another particularly popular television programme that features the dynamics of life in country houses is Downton Abbey, which aired on ITV in the United Kingdom and PBS in the United States.

See also 

 English country houses with changed use
 Estate houses in Scotland
 List of country houses in the United Kingdom
 List of National Trust properties in England
 List of English Heritage properties
 List of castles in England
 List of historic buildings of the United Kingdom – country house architectural periods and styles
 Historic house
 The Edwardian Country House, a Channel 4 series
 Downton Abbey
 Manor house
 Prodigy house
 Roman villa
 British country house contents auctions
 Country house theatre
 Country house poem
 Treasure Houses of England
 Country Life

References

Sources
 
  Details the impact of social change on design.
 
 
  Gives much detail of how a smaller country house operated in the early 20th century.
 
Robinson, John Martin, The English Country Estate, 1988, Century Hutchinson/ National Trust, ISBN 0712622756

External links

 The National Trust – England, Wales, & Northern Ireland
 The National Trust for Scotland
 English Heritage
 Historic Houses Association
 Hudson's Historic Houses and Gardens – Hudson's list of 2,000 properties open to the public
 The DiCamillo Companion to British & Irish Country Houses
 Lost Heritage – A Memorial to the Lost Country Houses of England

 
Country house
House types in the United Kingdom
House styles